Simone Brièrre (born 14 June 1937) is a French hurdler. She competed in the women's 80 metres hurdles at the 1960 Summer Olympics.

References

1937 births
Living people
Athletes (track and field) at the 1960 Summer Olympics
French female hurdlers
Olympic athletes of France
Place of birth missing (living people)